The Rainmakers is a 1935 American comedy film directed by Fred Guiol from a screenplay by Grant Garrett and Leslie Goodwins, based on a story by Guiol and Albert Traynor.  RKO Radio Pictures released the film on October 25, 1935, starring the comedy team of Wheeler & Woolsey (Bert Wheeler and Robert Woolsey) and Dorothy Lee.

Plot
Rainmakers Billy (Wheeler) and Roscoe (Woolsey) take on a crooked businessman out to cash in on a drought.

Cast
Bert Wheeler as Billy
Robert Woolsey as Roscoe
Dorothy Lee as Margie Spencer
Berton Churchill as Simon Parker
George Meeker as Orville Parker
Frederic Roland as Henry Spencer
Edgar Dearing as Kelly

References

External links 

The Rainmakers at TV Guide (A version of this 1987 write-up was originally published in The Motion Picture Guide)

1935 films
1935 comedy films
American black-and-white films
RKO Pictures films
Films directed by Fred Guiol
American comedy films
1930s English-language films
1930s American films